Xihua University (西华大学: "XHU（West China University)) is a public comprehensive university located in Chengdu, Sichuan Province, China.

Approved by the State Ministry of Education, Xihua University (XHU) was founded on April 16, 2003, formed by the merger of the former Sichuan University of Science and Technology and the former Teacher's College. The former Sichuan University of Science and Technology, once called the Sichuan Mechanical College of Agriculture, was founded in 1960. The former Teacher's College, located in Peng Zhou County, was founded in 1971.

Location
Xihua University covers about 2,850 mu (469.5 acres) in the Hi-tech zone of Chengdu. The campus has a tributary of Ming Jiang River winding through it, and the Ancient Irrigation Project—Du Jiangyan and its national scenery zone is to the west. XHU's school motto is “Diligence, Virtue and Excellence”.

Academics Achievement
More than 70 academicians of Chinese academy of sciences, Chinese academy of engineering and experts from China and abroad.

The university consists of 27 schools, one department and 68 undergraduate programs, covering the fields of science, management, liberal arts, technique, economy, law and education. Currently, the university enrolls students from 23 provinces and is qualified to enroll foreign students. There are about 22,000 full-time students, including 16,000 undergraduates and 400 graduates. It has been a Provincial Key Base for Personnel Training and Scientific Research. XHU students have won the first and the second national prizes in the National Electronic Design Competition for six years, the second national prize in Mathematical Model Design Competition, two national third prizes and organizing prizes in the Challenging Cup Competition in 2002, and a national third prize in 2000.

The university held the Table Tennis Game of the 6th National Game of the Undergraduates and won both the men's and women's gold and silver medals of the team title. The university is the National Art Education Model and has been awarded the prize of a National Model for excellent organization of students practice work. Therefore, employers for their creative and diligent spirit welcome students of XHU. For years, the employment rate has been above 85%.

XHU has established collaborative relations with more than 20 universities from nearly 14 countries and signed the 1-2-1 Educational Program with four American state universities, providing its students an opportunity to earn dual degrees from Chinese and American universities over the course of four or five years.

XHU has collected funds in many ways to develop itself. In 2002, the university signed an agreement with the Industrial and Commercial Bank of China and secured a loan of RMB one billion yuan. In 2002, the university signed another agreement with Xin Tiantong Co. Ltd, which will invest one-billion-yuan to build an extension of the campus.

Staff And Professor Resources 
Having paid great attention to the faculty building, XHU now has 1,400 teachers and staff members, among whom 380 teachers have the title of senior post. XHU has invited three academicians to be directors of the key provincial laboratories, 14 other academicians and 43 distinguished professors to be part-time professors.

External links
Official website (English version)
XiHua Online student journal – An online student journal from students of China West Normal University

 
Universities and colleges in Chengdu
2003 establishments in China
Educational institutions established in 2003